Calycolpus is a genus of the botanical family Myrtaceae, first described as a genus in 1856. It is native to the South America, Central America, and the West Indies.

The species formerly called Calycolpus excisus is a small tree known only from the limestone mountains of eastern Cuba, now known as Eugenia excisa. It is on the IUCN Red List of Threatened species.

Species
 Calycolpus aequatorialis Landrum - Sucumbíos
 Calycolpus alternifolius (Gleason) Landrum - S Venezuela
 Calycolpus andersonii Landrum - Pará
 Calycolpus australis Landrum - Minas Gerais
 Calycolpus bolivarensis Landrum - Bolívar State
 Calycolpus calophyllus (Kunth) O.Berg - Guyana, Venezuela, Colombia, Peru, N Brazil
 Calycolpus cochleatus McVaugh - Bolívar State, Guyana
 Calycolpus goetheanus (Mart. ex DC.) O.Berg - Trinidad, N South America
 Calycolpus legrandii Mattos - Alagoas, Bahia
 Calycolpus moritzianus (O.Berg) Burret - Venezuela, Colombia, Ecuador
 Calycolpus revolutus (Schauer) O.Berg - Guyana, Suriname, Fr Guiana
 Calycolpus roraimensis Steyerm. - Venezuela, Guyana, Rondônia, Peru
 Calycolpus sessiliflorus Landrum - Bahia
 Calycolpus surinamensis McVaugh - Guyana, Suriname, Pará
 Calycolpus warscewiczianus O.Berg - Costa Rica, Panama, Nicaragua

References

 
Myrtaceae genera
Neotropical realm flora